Halalabad or Helalabad may refer to:

Helalabad, Fars
Halalabad, Abyek, Qazvin
Halalabad, Qazvin